Lithophyllon repanda is a species of mushroom or disc coral in the family Fungiidae.This species is able to move to another location on occasion. The International Union for Conservation of Nature (IUCN) rated it as a least-concern species and it was originally described by Dana in 1846.

Description
Its septa are roughly equal and the septal teeth are visible. Its tentacles extend in the day and are pale in colour, but the species is without tentacular loes. It has granular costal spines and the species is brown in colour.

Distribution
It is found in the Gulf of Aden, the Red Sea, the southwestern and northern Indian Ocean, eastern Africa, northern, eastern, and western Australia, the East China Sea, Japan, and the western and central Pacific Ocean. It is common species and no population figures are available, but its population is believed to be declining in line with the global decline in coral reefs. It is threatened by coral disease, climate change, bleaching, predators, human activity, fishing, and parasites. A 1991 study discovered that 75% of observed specimens were bleached due to rising sea temperatures. It is rated as a least-concern species by the IUCN and is listed under CITES Appendix II.

Taxonomy
It was originally described as Fungia repanda by Dana in 1846.

References

Further reading

Dana, J.D. (1846). "United States Exploring Expedition during the years 1838-1842". Zoophytes 7: 1-740. Lea and Blanchard, Philadelphia.
ReefCorner - Fungia Coral Database Entry

Fungiidae
Cnidarians of the Indian Ocean
Cnidarians of the Pacific Ocean
Fauna of the Red Sea
Marine fauna of Africa
Marine fauna of Asia
Marine fauna of Oceania
Marine fauna of Southeast Asia
Marine fauna of Western Asia
Corals described in 1846
Taxa named by James Dwight Dana
Taxobox binomials not recognized by IUCN